Hanchar, sometimes transliterated Ganchar, is a surname. Notable people with the surname include:

 Katsiaryna Hanchar (born 1988), Belarusian sprinter
 Perry Ganchar (born 1963), Canadian ice hockey player
 Viktar Hanchar (born 1957), Belarusian politician

See also
 
 
 Honchar

Belarusian-language surnames